Swimming  has been part of African Games since its inaugural edition in 1965 and has continued to feature prominently at the competition in each of its subsequent editions.

Editions

Games records
All records were set in finals unless noted otherwise. All times are swum in a long-course (50m) pool.

Men

Women

Mixed relay

See also 

 List of African Games medalists in swimming
 List of African Games medalists in swimming (women)

References

 
Sports at the African Games
All-Africa Games